Kelbo is a department or commune of Soum Province in Burkina Faso.

References 

Departments of Burkina Faso
Soum Province